Glee: The Music, Volume 2 is the second soundtrack album by the cast of the American musical television series Glee, featuring songs from episodes nine to thirteen of the show's first season. It was first released on December 4, 2009 in Australia by Columbia Records. It has been certified platinum in Canada and Australia, and gold in the United Kingdom and the United States. Volume 2 received mixed reviews from critics, who praised the vocals of cast members Lea Michele, Amber Riley, and Kevin McHale, but felt the album was weak in arrangements and similar to a collection of karaoke tracks. All tracks were released as singles and performed on the series, with the exception of "Don't Make Me Over"—only an instrumental version was used.

Production and songs
Each of songs included on the album were released as singles, available for download. "True Colors" charted highest in all regions except America, reaching number 15 in Ireland, number 35 in the United Kingdom, number 38 in Canada, and number 47 in Australia. In America, the best-performing single was "Lean on Me", which charted at number 50. The only songs which failed to chart in any region were "(You're) Having My Baby" and "Don't Make Me Over". Karaoke versions of "Lean on Me", "My Life Would Suck Without You" and "True Colors" were also released, based on fan–demand and the popularity of karaoke tribute videos to the series.

Yoko Ono was hesitant about allowing Glee the rights to "Imagine". Series music supervisor P.J. Bloom explained: "It was very difficult to convince Yoko Ono that it was the right thing to do. She needed to truly understand how the music was going to be used. The added component of us wanting to have a deaf choir signing the song made for this incredibly poignant moment. ...It really took a lot of convincing to get her on board and realize that it was a great, great moment, and a tribute to John and his song." While a full version of "Don't Make Me Over" is included on the album, only an instrumental version was used in the show.

Reception

The album has received mixed reviews from critics. Whitney Pastorek of Entertainment Weekly felt that there was much about the album that should not work, including "sickly-sweet vocals", "theme-park-level arrangements" and "cheesy song choices". Despite this, she commented: "When the Glee kids nail something—like a version of Van Halen's "Jump" that made my cheeks sore from smiling—the title of this joyful franchise could not be more apt." Allmusic's Andrew Leahey observed that the soundtrack felt "a bit rushed" due to its release four weeks after Volume 1 and the fact it features songs from half as many episodes as the first album. He criticized: "As before, this album sometimes strays away from choral arrangements and sounds more like a collection of karaoke recordings." Overall, however, Leahey believed that returning fans would find the album enjoyable.

Christopher John Farley of The Wall Street Journal commented that Michele, Riley and McHale have "the most distinctive voices" of all the Glee cast members, suggesting that Michele's rendition of "Don't Rain on My Parade" would "have some listeners hoping she'll be sharing her talents with Broadway again soon." IGN's Brian Linder recommended the album to Glee fans only, opining that "only two or three tracks will be of interest to the non-hardcore fan. Unlike the first installment in the show's soundtrack series, Glee – The Music, Vol. 2 isn't going to win over any skeptics."

Track listing
Unless otherwise indicated, Information is taken from the album's Liner Notes

Notes
Lily Allen's "Smile" contains replayed elements of "Free Soul" written by Donat "Jackie" Mittoo and Clement Dodd.
While Dianna Agron, Chris Colfer, Jayma Mays and Mark Salling are listed in the "Glee Cast Vocals" section of the album's Liner notes, their vocals do not appear on any of the album's songs. While Naya Rivera is not credited in the notes, her vocals appear on the Japanese bonus track "The Boy Is Mine".

Personnel

Dianna Agron – vocals
Lily Allen – composer
Adam Anders – engineer, producer, additional vocals
Paul Anka – composer
Peer Åström – engineer, mixing, producer
Iyiola Babalola – composer
David Baloche – additional vocals
Dave Betts – art direction, design
PJ Bloom – supervisor
Geoff Bywater – executive in charge of music
Charlie Chaplin – composer
Kevin Clark – composer
Chris Colfer – vocals
Kamari Copeland – additional vocals
Hal David – composer
Tim Davis – additional vocals
Dante Di Loreto – executive producer
Tom Eyen – composer
Brad Falchuk – executive producer
John Fogerty – composer
Jerry Fuller – composer
Emily Gomez – additional vocals
Heather Guibert – coordination
Nikki Hassman – additional vocals
Chrissie Hynde – composer
Mick Jagger – composer
Jeannette Kaczorowski – cover design
Jenny Karr – additional vocals
Tom Kelly – composer
Robin Koehler – coordination

Henry Krieger – composer
Kerri Larson – additional vocals
John Lennon – composer
David Loucks – additional vocals
Meaghan Lyons – coordination
Chris Mann – additional vocals
Max Martin – composer
Maria Paula Marulanda – art direction, design
Jayma Mays – vocals
Kevin McHale – lead vocals
Lea Michele – lead vocals
Cory Monteith – lead vocals
Matthew Morrison – lead vocals
Mark Mueller – composer
Ryan Murphy – producer
Tiffany Palmer – additional vocals
Geoffrey Parsons – composer
Ryan Peterson – engineer
Keith Richards – composer
Lionel Richie – composer
Amber Riley – lead vocals
Mark Salling – vocals
Sting – composer
Jule Styne – composer
Louie Teran – mastering
Jenna Ushkowitz – lead vocals
Alex Van Halen – composer
Eddie Van Halen – composer
Windy Wagner – additional vocals
Bill Withers – composer

Source: allmusic.

Charts and certifications

Weekly charts

Year-end charts

Certifications

Release history

References

Glee (TV series) albums
2009 soundtrack albums
Columbia Records soundtracks